Gweru, originally known as Gwelo, is a city in central Zimbabwe. Near the geographical centre of the country. It is on the centre of Midlands Province. Originally an area known to the  Ndebele as "The Steep Place" because of the Gweru River's high banks, in 1894 it became the site of a military outpost established by Leander Starr Jameson. In 1914 it attained municipal status, and in 1971 it became a city.

The city has a population of 158,200 as of the 2022 census. Gweru is known for farming activities in beef cattle, crop farming, and commercial gardening of crops for the export market. It is also home to a number of colleges and universities, most prominently Midlands State University and Mkoba Teachers College.

The city was nicknamed City of Progress.

History 
Gweru used to be named Gwelo. Matabele settlement was named iKwelo (“The Steep Place”), after the river’s high banks. The modern town, founded in 1894 as a military outpost, developed as an agricultural centre and became a municipality in 1914.

Geography 
The geographical coordinates for Gweru Urban are 19° 27' 0'' South and 29° 49' 0''  East. This places Gweru at the centre of Zimbabwe. The area coverage is almost 46 166 km². The city is built alongside Bulawayo-Harare railway and the road near the railway spur to Mabuto.

Climate

Demographics

Nature and wildlife
In and around Gweru there are attractive places, some are man-made and some are natural. There is:

 Antelope Park
 White Waters
 Insukamini Ruins

Economy 
Situated along the road and railway between Harare (formerly Salisbury) and Bulawayo and near the rail spur to Maputo, Mozambique, Gweru has become a busy trade centre with modest industrial development. Its products include ferrochromium, textiles, dairy foods, leather, and building materials. The surrounding area, with its rich deposits of gold, chrome, iron, asbestos, and limestone, supports a number of mines. The training section of Zimbabwe’s air force is in Gweru at the Gweru-Thornhill Air Base.

The city is also known for vibrant farming activities in cattle ranching, and farming including, commercial gardening of crops for the export market. The country`s oldest shoe manufacturer, the Bata Shoe Company and the Military and Aviation Museums are also some key features for which Gweru is well known.

Culture 
The Boggie clock tower, located at the intersection of Main Street and Robert Mugabe Way, was built in 1928 in memory of Major William James Boggie. The clock tower is one of the city's most famous landmarks.

The Nalatale and Danangombe archaeological sites lie nearby, the former known for its patterned brickwork, the latter for its Portuguese remains. The remains at these sites date back to as early as the Torwa state during the 17th century, the most substantial being a four hundred-year-old stone wall decorated with motifs known to the tradition of stone-building in Zimbabwe. The surrounding area has rich deposits of gold, chrome, iron, asbestos and platinum and supports several mines.

Tourism 
The main hotel in the city is the Midlands Hotel, which was opened in 1927 by the Meikles brothers. This hotel was to be demolished but after many protests by the population it was saved. Another important hotel is the Chitukuko (formerly the Hotel Cecil), located in the downtown area of the city. Both hotels were owned by Patrick Kombayi, a former mayor. The Fairmile Motel is just one mile from the city center on the Bulawayo highway .

Sports and stadia

Soccer 
 Chapungu  Football Club

Chapungu F.C team was nicknamed Waru Waru and the team is  currently playing in  Zimbabwe Premier League Soccer League.   Its home is Ascot Stadium.

There is also Gweru Sports club which has playgrounds for rugby, bowling and cricket.

Government and politics

Education

Primary education 
Group A

Cecil John Rhodes School
Lundi Park School
Riverside School
Stanley School
Anderson Adventist Primary  School (private)
Lingfield Academy (private)
Midlands Christian School (private)

Group B

Airforce Thornhill Primary School
Bata School
Bumburwi School
Chikumbiro School
Matongo School
Mkoba 4 Primary School
Mpumelelo Primary School
Muwunga School
Sandara School
Senga Primary School
Takunda Primary School
Takwirira Primary School
St. Michael's Primary School (Catholic)
St. Paul's School (Catholic)

Secondary education 
Group A

 Sacred Heart  College (private)https://www.google.com/search?gs_ssp=eJzj4tVP1zc0zDJPziisMko3YLRSNagwtDQ2sTQ0NTZOMUg1S7NIsTKoME2xMEkxTkxKNEhKMjBLTvaSKk5MLkpNUchITSwqUUjOz8lJTU9VSC9PLSoFANDxGX8&q=sacred+heart+college+gweru&oq=sacred&aqs=chrome.2.69i57j69i59j46j0l3j69i61l2.5111j0j1&sourceid=chrome&ie=UTF-8

Chaplin High School
Guinea Fowl High School
Nashville Secondary School
Thornhill High School
Anderson Adventist High School (private)
Lingfield Christian Academy (private)
Midlands Christian College (private)

Group B

 Ascot Secondary School
 Fletcher High School
 Mambo High School
 Matinunura High school
 Mkoba 1 High School
 Mkoba 3 High School
 Senka Secondary School

Tertiary education 

 Ambassador College
 Central Africa Correspondence College
 Commercial Studies Centre
 Educare College
Gweru Polytechnic Institute
Herentals College
International Correspondence Schools
 Kaguvi National Technical College
 Mkoba Teachers College
 Midlands Christian Training Centre
 Midlands State University
 Rapid Results College
 Senka Technical Training Centre
 Solars College
 TopFlight Secretarial College
 Zimbabwe Distance Education College
Zimbabwe Open University
Mount Hermon Theological Seminary

Defunct colleges and universities 
 Midlands College of Commerce (closed 1994)

Media 
Gweru's local newspaper, The Gweru Times, once ceased publishing in 2015 but now operational.

Industry 
In Gweru there are big companies that are still operating and are still capable of employing hundreds of employees. Not forgetting future big companies which are SMEs are also listed. These companies are in and around Gweru. Below are the list of companies grouped according to size and type of the industry. Some of the companies in Gweru are Bata Shoe Company, ZimGlass, ZimCast, ZimAlloys, Delta Corporation, Anchor Yeast, and Midlands State University.

Transportation

Railway
Railways arrived in Gwelo (Gweru) in 1902. National Railways of Zimbabwe have the country's largest marshalling yard, Dabuka, on the south side of Gweru.  Dabuka plays a pivotal role in rail movement in the country as it is the central hub of the rail links to Mozambique in the east, South Africa in the south and Botswana and Namibia in the south west, lying on the Beira–Bulawayo railway.

Gwelo was once home to the Gwelo & District Light Railway, a 2 ft gauge steam for pleasure railway.

Roads
As a central city (hub), it has direct links to all the other cities and towns of Zimbabwe. It is 164 km from Bulawayo, 183 km from Masvingo, 471 km from Beitbridge, and 275 km from Harare.

Road names used are by destination only, for example the Harare-Bulawayo Road. There are only mainroads, no highways or freeways.

Notable people 

 Brendan Ashby, Olympic swimmer
 Prince (Oskid) Tapfuma, Music Producer
 Tamuka (Dj Tamuka) Muponda-Makuluni, Music Producer
 Itai (Madiz) Madzikura, Musician
 Clifford (Mr Chiks muShurugwi) Chikerema, Civil Engineer, Music Producer
 Patient Charumbira, cricketer
 Shimmer Chinodya, writer
 Edmore Chirambadare, footballer
 Gerald B. Clarke, Rhodesian politician
 Malcolm Grainger, cricketer
 Gregg Haakonsen, cricketer
 Mandy Loots, Olympic swimmer
 Orlando Lourenco, tennis player
 Paddington Mhondoro, cricketer
 Energy Murambadoro, footballer
 Kudakwashe Musharu, footballer
 Luther Mutyambizi, cricketer
 Christopher Muzvuru, Irish Guards piper
 Welshman Ncube, politician
 Rudolf Nyandoro, Roman Catholic bishop
 David Pocock, Australia international rugby union player 
 Ray Reed, racing driver
 Nkululeko Mkastos Sibanda, politician
 Alec Smith, Rhodesian Army chaplain, son of Ian Smith
 Thomas Sweswe, footballer
 Gary Teichmann, South Africa international rugby union player
 Joseph "Man Soul Jah" Nhara, musician and Media executive

Sister cities
 Basildon, England, United Kingdom
 Manchester, United States
 Tsumeb, Namibia

See also 
 List of cities and towns in Zimbabwe

References

 
Gweru District
Populated places in Midlands Province
Provincial capitals in Zimbabwe
Populated places established in 1894